David Ingolf Maurstad (born August 26, 1953) is an American politician and government official who was the 36th lieutenant governor of Nebraska from 1999 to 2001. He was appointed mitigation division director at Federal Emergency Management Agency (FEMA) in 2006.

Education 
Maurstad received his Bachelor of Science in business administration and Master of Business Administration from the University of Nebraska–Lincoln.

Career 
Maurstad was an insurance agent for nearly 25 years and later served as the mayor of Beatrice and as a member of the Nebraska Legislature. He was lieutenant governor from 1999 to 2001. In 2001, he became director of the Federal Emergency Management Agency Region VIII (Colorado, Montana, North Dakota, South Dakota, Utah, Wyoming). He was appointed Mitigation Division director at FEMA in 2006. He serves as its deputy associate administrator for Federal Insurance and Mitigation (FIMA) and as the senior executive of the National Flood Insurance Program (NFIP).

References

External links

FEMA promotion

1953 births
Living people
People from Beatrice, Nebraska
Lieutenant Governors of Nebraska
Mayors of places in Nebraska
Republican Party Nebraska state senators
Federal Emergency Management Agency officials
People from North Platte, Nebraska